Chvalovice is a municipality and village in Znojmo District in the South Moravian Region of the Czech Republic. It has about 700 inhabitants.

Geography

Chvalovice lies on the border with Austria. There is the road border crossing Hatě / Kleinhaugsdorf.

Administrative parts
The hamlet of Hatě is an administrative part of Lažánky.

References

Villages in Znojmo District